Education in South Korea is provided by both public schools and private schools. Both types of schools receive funding from the government, although the amount that the private schools receive is less than the amount of the state schools.

South Korea is one of the top-performing OECD countries in reading, literacy, mathematics and sciences with the average student scoring about 519, compared with the OECD average of 493, which ranks Korean education at ninth place in the world. The country has one of the world's highest-educated labor forces among OECD countries. South Korea is well known for its high standards about education, which has come to be called "education fever". The nation is consistently ranked amongst the top for global education.

Higher education is an overwhelmingly serious issue in South Korean society, where it's viewed as one of the fundamental capstones of South Korean life. As education is regarded as a high priority for South Korean families, as success in education is crucial for channeling one's social mobility to ultimately improve one's socioeconomic position in South Korean society. Academic success is often a source of pride for families and within South Korean society at large as much of the South Korean populace view success in education as the main propeller of social mobility for themselves and their family as a gateway to the South Korean middle class. Graduating from a top South Korean university is the ultimate distinctive and distinguishing marker of prestige, high socioeconomic status, promising marriage prospects, and a path to a prestigious and respectable white-collar professional occupation. Many South Korean parents hold high educational expectations for their children starting from a young age, as such parents take responsibility by actively emphasizing high academic achievement and actively monitor in their children's academic performance by ensuring that their children do well in school and earn top grades in order to qualify and secure enrollment in the nation's most esteemed universities, as gaining entrance into a top-ranked and prestigious South Korean university is the typical pathway that leads to a prestigious and well-paying professional white collar occupation. To uphold the family honor and tradition, many South Korean children are expected to go to a top university and pursue a prestigious white collar professional occupation as their future career of choice. Starting from a young age, an average South Korean child's life revolves around education as the parental demands to succeed academically is deeply ingrained in a South Korean child from an early age. Students are faced with immense pressure to succeed academically from their parents, teachers, peers, and society. This is largely a result of a society that has excessively overstressed an enormous premium on the importance of going to university, as those lacking formal university education in South Korea often face social prejudice as well as significant life-long consequences such as stagnant and lower socioeconomic status, diminishing marriage prospects, and low probabilities of securing a respectable white collar and professional career path.

In 2016, South Korea spent 5.4 percent of its GDP on all levels of education – roughly 0.4 percentage points above the OECD average. A strong investment in education, a militant drive and desire to achieve academic success, as well as the passion for academic excellence has helped the resource poor country rapidly grow its economy over the past 70 years from the effects of the Korean War. South Korea's zeal for education and its students' desires to get into a prestigious university is one of the highest in the world, as the entrance into a top tier higher educational institution leads to a prestigious, secure and well-paid professional white collar job with the South Korean government, bank, or a well-known South Korean conglomerate company such as Samsung, Hyundai and LG Electronics. With incredible pressure placed on high school students to secure places at the nation's most prestigious universities, its institutional reputation, campus facilities and equipment, endowment, faculty, and alumni networks are strong predictors of future career prospects. The top three universities in `South Korea, often referred to as "SKY", are Seoul National University, Korea University and Yonsei University. Intense competition and academic pressure to earn the highest grades throughout the arc of their schoolhood years for a young South Korean student is deeply ingrained in their psyche at a young age. Yet with only so many places at the nation's elite universities and even with a narrower bandwidth of job openings at the nation's most recognized companies, many young South Korean university graduates remain disappointed and are often unwilling to lower their expectations with regards to employment prospects with the result of many feeling as underachievers as not commensurate with the amount of effort and resources that they put in. There is a major cultural taboo in South Korean society attached to those who have not achieved formal university education, as those who don't hold university degrees face social prejudice and are often contemptuously looked down by others as second-class citizens, resulting in fewer opportunities for employment, improvement of one's socioeconomic position, and auspicious prospects for marriage.

International reception on the South Korean education system has been divided. It has been praised for various reasons, including its comparatively high test results and its major role in ushering South Korea's economic development while creating one of the world's most educated workforces. South Korea's highly enviable academic performance has gotten British education ministers actively remodeling their own curriculums and exams to try to emulate Korea's militant drive and passion for scholarly excellence and high educational achievement. Former U.S. President Barack Obama has also lauded the country's rigorous school system, where over 80 percent of South Korean high school graduates go on to enroll at a university. The nation's high university entrance rate has created a highly skilled workforce making South Korea among the most highly educated countries in the world with the one of the highest percentage of its citizens per capita holding a tertiary education degree. Large majorities of South Korean students go on to enroll in some form of tertiary education and leave higher education graduating with a tertiary qualification. In 2017, South Korea ranked fifth for the percentage of 25 to 64-year-olds that have attained tertiary education with 47.7 percent. 69.8 percent of South Koreans aged 25 to 34 years old have completed some form of tertiary education with 34.2 percent of South Koreans aged 25 to 64 having attained a bachelor's degree which is one of the highest among OECD countries.

The system's rigid and hierarchical structure has been criticized for stifling creativity and innovation; described as intensely and "brutally" competitive, The system is often blamed for the high suicide rate in South Korea, particularly the growing rates among those aged 10–19. Various media outlets attribute the nation's high suicide rate on the nationwide anxiety around the country's college entrance exams, which determine the trajectory of students' entire lives and careers, though teenage suicide rates (ages 15–19) still remain below those of the United States and Canada. Former South Korean hagwon teacher Se-Woong Koo wrote that the South Korean education system amounts to child abuse and that it should be "reformed and restructured without delay". The system has also been criticized for producing a glut of university graduates competing for a limited number of open job placements, thereby creating an overeducated and underemployed labor force; where in the first quarter of 2013 alone, nearly 3.3 million South Korean university graduates were jobless, leading many graduates overqualified for lower-ranked jobs that are less prestigious and require lower levels of education. Further criticism has been stemmed for causing labor shortages in various skilled blue collar labor and vocational occupations, where many go unfilled as the negative social stigma associated with vocational careers and not having a university degree continues to remain deep-rooted in contemporary South Korean society.

History

Pre-division period

Education has been present throughout the history of Korea (1945–present). Public schools and private schools have both been present. Modern reforms to education began in the late 19th century. Since its early history, Korean education has been influenced significantly by Confucian values particularly in its emphasis of formal learning and scholarship through China more than fifteen centuries ago. Confucianism instilled facilities like governance of men by merit, social mobility through education, and the civil examination system based on the system that was developed in China during the Tang Dynasty. As a result, written word and mastery of Chinese classics and literacy became the primary method in choosing individuals for bureaucratic positions, gaining them a respective social status and privileges.

The Joseon period was significant in shaping the dynamics and foundation of the Korean education system in that it established schools that ingrained loyalty, orthodoxy, and motivation for official recruitment into its students. The primary means to receive an education during the Joseon dynasty were through village schools (seodang; seojae) and through private tutoring. The seodang was the most common method of formal education in Korea until the late twentieth century, and was usually available only to a handful of neighborhood boys starting at around age seven. In the middle of the sixteenth century, however, the role of official schools gradually declined with the emergence of private academies (seowon), which usually functioned as rural retreats and centers of learning until the majority of them were closed in the 1870s in an effort to centralize authority.

Preparing students for competitive examinations were pronounced during the Joseon dynasty as a means of social mobility and selection of official positions, and remained a basic tenet in Korean education throughout its history. However, this extreme emphasis on education and meritocracy was contrasted by hereditary aristocracy during the Joseon dynasty, where bloodlines and kinship were particularly pronounced. Due to Confucian influences, however, education was able to maintain a fairly equalizing presence over society because of its belief in each individual being capable of benefitting from formal education and achieving enlightenment. Education was also dominated by the exalted scholar-teacher relationship, where teachers held almost a sacred status and were seen as a principal source of ethical counsel. This convention also engendered the tradition of remonstrance, which obligated the scholar to criticize the actions of the government and even the king in order to avoid threatening the Confucian-inspired concept of the moral order of the universe.

The dynastic period did not prioritize special or technical training, and thus a preference for a non-specialized and literary education has remained in Korea. Many of these developments were pronounced towards the end of the 19th century when the Joseon dynasty began implementing a Western-style education system as a result of the intrusion of foreign powers into Korea. By 1904, public education was largely confined to Seoul, which was generally resisted by the public as well as government officials. This maintained the dominance of seodang and other traditional institutions as the primary means to receive a formal education. However, as a result of financial support from members of the royal family and American missionary activities and schools, the number of schools began to increase in the early 1900s. As a means to promote basic literacy among its citizens, Korea also introduced mixed script of Hangul and Chinese characters into its instruction.

During the Japanese occupation (1905–1945), Korea was able to establish a comprehensive and modern system of national education through centralization and deliberate planning of integrating Japanese occupational professionalism and values. However, there were severe restrictions like the lack of access to education beyond the elementary level for Koreans and the manipulation of education to indoctrinate Korean subjects to be loyal to the Japanese empire, which led to turmoil and discontent among Koreans who were forced to assimilate. The Japanese emphasized low-level and non-professional track schooling for Koreans which was pronounced by the Educational Ordinance of 1911, where Japanese residents had fourteen years of schooling available while Koreans only had eight years available to them, unless they were civil servants wherein eleven was the maximum. Schooling was primarily based on Japanese values, literacy, and history as an attempt to make young Koreans loyal to the Japanese state and indirectly wipe out Korean culture and history. As a minor development, the Educational Ordinance of 1922 was enacted, which reopened the Seoul Teachers' School, extended elementary and secondary education, and added college preparatory or advanced technical training to the curriculum.

Higher education became a central issue for upper-class and upwardly mobile Koreans, who were provided very limited access to these institutions as well as positions of administration and teaching. Furthermore, with the introduction of the Educational Ordinance of 1938, Korean schools were to be identical to Japanese ones in organization and curriculum, which made education a highly militarized and regimented tool for forced assimilation and militarization. These last few years of Japanese rule pronounced the discontent of Koreans whose social and political climates had been deeply affected.

Post-war years
After Gwangbokjeol and the liberation from Japan, the Korean government began to study and discuss for a new philosophy of education. The new educational philosophy was created under the United States Army Military Government in Korea (USAMGIK) with a focus on democratic education. The new system attempted to make education available to all students equally and promote the educational administration to be more self-governing. It also emphasized a decentralized education which local and community control in order to maintain educational autonomy from authoritarian policies. Specific policies included: re-educating teachers, lowering functional illiteracy by educating adults, restoration of the Korean language for technical terminology, and expansion of various educational institutions. This system did not instigate radical change, however, to the extent that it maintained the centralized and authoritarian administration created by the Japanese with no meaningful changes. It did, however, abet in the Koreanization of South Korean education through the initiative of Korean leaders by promoting Hangul, removing Japanese instruction practices, and emphasizing Korean history, geography, and literature. Aside from these developments, the most striking feature of the U.S. military occupation was the significant expansion of schooling and the student population.

Following the Korean War, the government of Syngman Rhee reversed many of these reforms after 1948, when only primary schools remained in most cases coeducational and, because of a lack of resources, education was compulsory only up to the sixth grade. In 1948, the prevalent debate in South Korean education was whether to maintain an elitist multitrack path based on the pre-war Japanese colonial model, or adopt an open American system that avoided early tracking and did not terminalize primary or secondary education.

During the years when Rhee and Park Chung Hee were in power, the control of education was gradually taken out of the hands of local school boards and concentrated in a centralized Ministry of Education. In the late 1980s, the ministry was responsible for the administration of schools, allocation of resources, setting of enrollment quotas, certification of schools and teachers, curriculum development (including the issuance of textbook guidelines), and other basic policy decisions. Provincial and special city boards of education still existed. Although each board was composed of seven members who were supposed to be selected by popularly elected legislative bodies, this arrangement ceased to function after 1973. Subsequently, school board members were approved by the minister of education. In high school they would call it year one grade (9th grader) and year 2 would be (10th grader) and so on. Therefore, a multitrack and single secondary school system prevailed, largely due to the fact that administrators did not want to divide institutions, and parents were not receptive to the idea of two entrance exams. The outcome the 1950 MOE proposal for a uniform system was a 6-4-3-4 academic schedule, which entailed 6 years of primary school, 4 years of middle school, 3 years of vocational or academic high school, and 4 years of college or university. A complex system of technical and vocational training was also added to educational policy, where children were able to decide on an academic versus a vocational route early on in their academic career. Many opponents of this policy actually viewed it as positive because they believed that the academic route would seem more prolific and parents and students would be willing to pursue it more than the vocational route. Furthermore, even though a few local school boards were established toward the late 1940s, they were not appreciated by many Koreans because there was a widespread notion that a uniform and centrally controlled system is best. A rigorous and uniform national curriculum was established in the mid-1950s and there were significant efforts to make school accessible for everyone, especially in the context of Rhee's declaration of compulsory universal literacy and basic education. While universal basic education eliminated disparities between classes, competition became very fierce due to restricted entry into higher academic tiers, which contributed to the predominant "education fever" that is still prevalent in South Korea.

In the 1960s, there was a difficulty in harnessing the demand for education towards the needs of an industrializing economy, which caused a growth in private foundations in order to supply the public demand for schooling. Furthermore, the 60s and 70s were characterized by a large demand to direct educational development to economic development, which necessitated a greater emphasis on vocational and technical training rather than academic training in order to help citizens gain skills that would supply the country's economic needs. Even though there were major criticisms on behalf of the public for this emphasis on vocational training due to a clashing with Confucian values, the state continued to strengthen vocational education, especially after the shift in industrialization to heavy chemical and machine industries in the 70s. The 1960s and 70s experienced turmoil in education systems due to public resistance and the recalcitrance of private schools toward the state as they attempted to supply public demand. While the state was able to fulfill many of its economic goals, it came at a great social and political cost such as the de-population of rural areas and President Park's assassination.

Most observers agree that South Korea's spectacular progress in modernization and economic growth since the Korean War is largely attributable to the willingness of individuals to invest a large amount of resources in education: the improvement of "human capital". The traditional esteem for the educated man, now extends to scientists, technicians, and others working with specialized knowledge. Highly educated technocrats and economic planners could claim much of the credit for their country's economic successes since the 1960s. Scientific professions were generally regarded as the most prestigious by South Koreans in the 1980s.

Statistics demonstrate the success of South Korea's national education programs. In 1945 the adult literacy rate was estimated at 22 percent; by 1970 adult literacy was 87.6 percent and, by the late 1980s, sources estimated it at around 93 percent. Although only primary school (grades one through six) was compulsory, percentages of age-groups of children and young people enrolled in secondary level schools were equivalent to those found in industrialized countries, including Japan. Approximately 4.8 million students in the eligible age group were attending primary school in 1985. The percentage of students going on to optional middle school the same year was more than 99 percent. Approximately 34 percent, one of the world's highest rates of secondary-school graduates attended institutions of higher education in 1987, a rate similar to Japan's (about 30 percent) and exceeding Britain's (20 percent).

Government expenditure on education has been generous. In 1975, it was 220 billion won, the equivalent of 2.2 percent of the gross national product, or 13.9 percent of total government expenditure. By 1986, education expenditure had reached 3.76 trillion won, or 4.5 percent of the GNP, and 27.3 percent of government budget allocations.

The 1980s and 1990s marked an era of democratization and economic prosperity in South Korea, partly due to the "education fever". In 1991, for the first time in thirty years, the country elected provincial and city councils in order to localize education, and leaders like Kim Young-sam and Kim Dae-jung were able to enact major overhauls to the education system in order to accommodate democratization through methods like abolishing on-campus ROTCS training and political mobilization of students, legalization of teacher unions, and removing anti-communist texts. The MOE began to shift away from a uniform curriculum by allowing school boards to implement some minor variations in instructional content. Literacy became virtually universal in South Korea while it rose up in international ranks in math and science, especially.

Despite South Korea's democratization, traditional and Confucian values remained very strong. Overall, the huge strides in educational development came at the cost of intense pressure among students, high suicide rates, and family financial struggles through investment in schooling and private tutoring. However, Korea is shifting away from fully academic-based education to competency-based education. (So, K., & Kang, J. (2014)

Student activism
Student activism has a long and honorable history in Korea. Students in Joseon secondary schools often became involved in the intense factional struggles of the scholar-official class. Students played a major role in Korea's independence movement, particularly on March 1, 1919, which was a protest based on students' growing resentment towards restrictive, discriminatory, and hostile Japanese occupation and instruction practices. Students were also heavily involved in repeated national efforts and demonstrations against Japanese policies, with instances like the Gwangju Student Movement in 1929 and the June 10 1926 funeral line protest.

Students protested against the regimes of Syngman Rhee and Park Chung-hee during the 1950s, 1960s, and 1970s. Observers noted, however, that while student activists in the past generally embraced liberal and democratic values, the new generation of militants in the 1980s were far more radical. Most participants adopted some version of the minjung ideology but was also animated by strong feelings of popular nationalism and xenophobia.

One of the most extreme and landmark movements was the Gwangju Massacre in 1980, where students were driven by a strong will to rebel through Marxist influences against the martial law government. This radicalism was paralleled by the communist sympathizing and radicalism of students in the 1940s and 50s as a result of American occupation.

The most militant university students, perhaps about 5 percent of the total enrollment at Seoul National University and comparable figures at other institutions in the capital during the late 1980s, were organized into small circles or cells rarely containing more than fifty members. Police estimated that there were 72 such organizations of varying orientation, having the change of curriculum and education system of South Korea people have been enriched in an imaginary way that makes them propel in all their studies.

Reforms in the 1980s
Following the assumption of power by General Chun Doo-hwan in 1980, the Ministry of Education implemented a number of reforms designed to make the system more fair and to increase higher education opportunities for the population at large. In a very popular move, the ministry dramatically increased enrollment at large.

Social emphasis on education was not without its problems, as it tended to accentuate class differences. In the late 1980s, a college degree was considered necessary for entering the middle class; there were no alternative pathways of social advancement, with the possible exception of a military career, outside higher education. People without a college education, including skilled workers with vocational school backgrounds, often were treated as second-class citizens by their white-collar, college-educated managers, despite the importance of their expertise and skills in playing a role in advancing South Korea's economic development. Intense competition for places at the most prestigious universities—the sole gateway into elite circles—promoted, analogous to the   Confucian system, a sterile emphasis on rote memorization in order to pass secondary school and college entrance examinations. Particularly after a dramatic expansion of college enrollments in the early 1980s, South Korea faced the problem of what to do about a large number of young people staying in school for a long time, usually at great sacrifice to themselves and their families, and then faced with limited job opportunities because their skills were not marketable.

School grades
Note: Unbracketed ages are in international years; bracketed ages are according to the age system in Korea.

Kindergarten
The number of private kindergartens has increased as a result of more women entering the workforce, growth in the number of nuclear families in which a grandparent is often unavailable to take care of children, and the view that kindergarten might give children an "edge" in later educational competition. Many students in Korea start kindergarten at the Western age of three and will, therefore, continue to study in kindergarten for three or four years, before starting their formal education in grade one of primary school. Many private kindergartens offer classes in English to give students a head start in the mandatory English education they will receive later in public school. Kindergartens often pay homage to the expectations of parents with impressive courses, graduation ceremonies, complete with diplomas and gowns. Korean kindergartens are expected to teach basic math, reading, and writing to children, including education on how to count, add, subtract, and read and write in Korean, and often in English and Chinese as well. Children in Korean kindergartens are also taught using games focused on education and coordination, such as "playing doctor" to teach body parts, food and nutrition, and adult occupations. Singing, dancing, and memorization are a big part of Korean kindergarten education.

Primary education

Elementary schools (chodeung hakgyo) consists of grades one to six (age 8 to age 13 in Korean years—7 to 12 in western years). The South Korean government changed its name to the current form from Citizens' school (.

In elementary school, students learn the following subjects. The curriculum differs from grades 1–2 to grades 3–6.

Grades 1–2:
We Are First Graders (grade 1 only)
Korean (listening, speaking, reading, writing)
Mathematics
Disciplined Life
Sensible Life
Enjoyable Life
The above three classes changed a few years ago into "Spring (봄, Bom)", "Summer (여름, Yeoreum)", "Fall (가을, Ga-eul)", "Winter (겨울, Gyeo-ul)"
Physical Education

Grades 3–6:
Korean (listening, speaking, reading, writing)
English
Moral Education
Social Studies
Mathematics
Science
Art
Music
Practical Arts
Physical Education

Usually, the class teacher covers most of the subjects; however, there are some specialised teachers in professions such as physical education and foreign languages, including English.

Those who wish to become a primary school teacher must major in primary education, which is specially designed to cultivate primary school teachers. In Korea, most of the primary teachers are working for public primary schools.

Because corporal punishment has been officially and legally prohibited in every classroom since 2011, many teachers and some parents raised with corporal punishment are becoming more concerned about what they see as worsening discipline problems. Some teachers continue to use corporal punishment discreetly.

Secondary education
In 1987, there were approximately 4,895,354 students enrolled in middle schools and high schools, with approximately 150,873 teachers. About 69 percent of these teachers were male. About 98% of Korean students finish secondary education. The secondary-school enrollment figure also reflected changing population trends—there were 3,959,975 students in secondary schools in 1979. Given the importance of entry into higher education, the majority of students attended general or academic high schools in 1987: 1,397,359 students, or 60 percent of the total, attended general or academic high schools, as compared with 840,265 students in vocational secondary schools. Vocational schools specialized in a number of fields: primarily agriculture, fishery, commerce, trades, merchant marine, engineering, and the arts.

Competitive entrance examinations at the middle-school level were abolished in 1968. Although as of the late 1980s, students still had to pass noncompetitive qualifying examinations, they were assigned to secondary institutions by lottery, or else by location within the boundary of the school district. Secondary schools, formerly ranked according to the quality of their students, have been equalized, with a portion of good, mediocre, and poor students being assigned to each one. The reform, however, did not equalize secondary schools completely. In Seoul, students who performed well in qualifying examinations were allowed to attend better quality schools in a "common" district, while other students attended schools in one of five geographical districts. The reforms applied equally to public and private schools whose enrollments were strictly controlled by the Ministry of Education.

In South Korea, the grade of a student is reset as the student progresses through elementary, middle and high school. To differentiate the grades between students, one would often state the grade based on the level of education he/she is in. For example, a student in the first year of middle school would be referred to as "First grade in Middle School (중학교 1학년.)".

Middle schools are called Jung hakgyo (중학교) in Korean, which literally means middle school. High schools are called Godeung hakgyo (고등학교) in Korean, literally meaning "high school".

Middle school
Middle schools in South Korea consist of three grades. Most students enter at age 12 and graduate at age 14 or 15. These three grades correspond roughly to grades 7–9 in the North American system and Years 8–10 in the English and Welsh system.

Middle school in South Korea marks a considerable shift from primary school, with students expected to take their studies much more seriously. At most middle schools, there used to be many rules on uniforms and haircuts, although now only uniforms remain partially enforced, and education stress is highly increased. Like in primary school, students spend most of the day in the same homeroom classroom with the same classmates; however, students have different teachers for each subject. Teachers move around from classroom to classroom, and few teachers apart from those who teach special subjects have their own rooms to which students come. Homeroom teachers (담임 교사, RR: damim gyosa) play a very important role in students' lives.

Most middle school students take seven lessons a day, and in addition to this usually have an early morning block that precedes regular lessons and an eighth lesson specializing in an extra subject to finish the day. Unlike high school, middle school curricula do not vary much from school to school. Korean, Algebra, Geometry, English, social studies, and science form the core subjects, with students also receiving instruction in music, art, PE, Korean history, ethics, home economics, secondary language, technology, and Hanja. Which subjects students study and to what extent may change from year to year. All regular lessons are 45 minutes long. Before school, students have an extra block of 30 minutes or longer that may be used for self-study, watching Educational Broadcast System (EBS) broadcasts, or for personal or class administration. Beginning in 2008, students attended school Monday through Friday, and had a half-day every 1st, 3rd, and 5th (calendar permitting) Saturday of the month. Saturday lessons usually included Club Activity (CA) lessons, where students could participate in extracurricular activities. Unfortunately, many schools have regular classes without extracurricular activities because schools and parents want students to study more. Despite this, from 2012 onwards, primary and secondary schools, including middle schools, now do not hold Saturday classes. To this day, many schools still hold Saturday classes illegally because the parents want their children to go to school and study.

In 1969, the government abolished entrance examinations for middle school students, replacing it with a system whereby primary school students within the same district are selected for middle schools by a lottery system. This has the effect of equalizing the quality of students from school to school, though schools in areas where students come from more privileged backgrounds still tend to outperform schools in poorer areas. Until recently, most middle schools have been same-sex, though in the past decade most new middle schools have been coed, and some previously same-sex schools have converted to coed as well. Some schools have converted to same-sex due to pressure from parents who thought that their children would study better in single-sex education.

As with primary schools, students pass from grade to grade regardless of knowledge or academic achievement, the result being that classes often have students of vastly different abilities learning the same subject material together. In the final year of middle school examination scores become very important for top students hoping to gain entrance into top high schools, and for those in the middle hoping to get into an academic rather than a technical or vocational high school. Otherwise, examinations and marks only matter insofar as living up to a self-enforced concept of position in the school ranking system. There are some standardized examinations for certain subjects, and teachers of academic subjects are expected to follow approved textbooks, but generally middle school teachers have more flexibility over curricula and methods than teachers in high school.

More than 95% of middle school students also attend privately run, for-profit, after-school tutoring agencies known as hagwon (학원), or "cram schools", in order to receive extra instruction from private tutors. The core subjects, especially the cumulative subjects of Korean, English, and math, receive the most emphasis. Some hagwon specialize in just one subject, while others offer all core subjects, constituting a second round of schooling every day for their pupils. Indeed, some parents place more stress on their children's hagwon studies than their public school studies. Additionally, many students attend academies for things such as martial arts or music. Thus, many middle school students, like their high school counterparts, return from a day of schooling well after sunset. The average South Korean family spends 20% percent of its income on after-hours cram schools, more spending per capita on private tutoring than any other country.

High school

High schools in South Korea teach students for three years, from first grade (age 15–16) to third grade (age 17–18), and students commonly graduate at age 17 or 18. High school students are commonly expected to study increasingly long hours each year moving toward graduation, to become competitive and enter extremely attractive universities in Korea. Many high school students wake and leave home in the morning at 5am. When the school is over at 4pm, they usually go to a studying room in the school or to a library to study instead of going home. This is called "yaja", which literally means "evening self-study". They do not need to go home to eat dinner since most schools provide paid dinner for students. After finishing yaja (which usually ends at 11:00 pm, but later than 12:00 am at some schools), they return home after studying, then usually return to specialty study schools (hagwon) often until 3am, from Monday to Friday. In addition, they often study on weekends.

The yaja (야자, 야간자율학습, night self study) had not been truly "self" study for more than 30 years; all high school students were forced to do it. From the 2010s, the Ministry of Education has encouraged high schools to free students of yaja and to allow them to do it whenever they want. Many standard public high schools near Seoul are now no longer forcing students do it. But private high schools, special-purpose high schools (such as science high schools and foreign language high schools), or normal schools far from Seoul are still forcing students to do yaja.

A common saying in Korea is: "If you sleep three hours each night, you may get into a top 'SKY university' (Seoul National University, Korea University, and Yonsei University). If you sleep four hours each night, you may get into another university. If you sleep five or more hours each night, especially in your last year of high school, forget about getting into any university." Accordingly, many high school students in their final year do not have any free time for holidays, birthdays or vacations before the CSATs (College Scholastic Ability Test, Korean: 수능, Suneung), which are university entrance exams held by the Ministry of Education. Surprisingly, some high school students are offered chances to travel with family to enjoy fun and relaxing vacations, but these offers are often refused on the first suggestion by the students themselves, and increasingly on later additional trips if any, due to peer influences and a fear of "falling behind" in classes. Many high school students seem to prefer staying with friends and studying, rather than taking a break. Truancy is extremely rare in Korea. Rebellious students will often stay in class and use smartphones connected to the internet to chat with friends behind the teacher's back during classes, which usually get them in trouble if caught.

High schools in Korea can be divided into specialty tracks that accord with a student's interest and career path or a normal state high school. For special high schools, there are science (Science high school), foreign language, international, and art specialty high schools that students can attend by passing entrance examinations which are generally highly competitive. These schools are called special-purpose high schools. Autonomous private high schools are relatively free of the policy of the Ministry of Education. Also, there are schools for gifted students. Tuition of many special-purpose high schools, autonomous private high schools, and schools for gifted students are extremely expensive (the average of tuition of special-purpose or autonomous private high school is US$5,614 per year.) One of the schools for gifted students is US$7,858 per year. There are a few schools that require more than what is calculated as an average. CheongShim International Academy, Hankuk Academy of Foreign Studies, Korean Minjok Leadership Academy, and Hana Academy Seoul are infamous for their expensive tuition. Simultaneously, these schools are known for students' high academic achievement and college results, sending more than 50% of their students to "SKY universities" yearly. Other types of high schools include standard public high schools and standard private high schools, both with or without entrance examinations. These high schools do not specialize in a particular field but are more focused on sending their students to top and popular colleges.

However, since the emergence of special-purpose, autonomous private schools, international schools, and schools for gifted students, standard high schools struggle to send students to "top and popular" universities. Standard high schools generally cannot compete with specialized schools' infrastructures, teaching resources, and activities that improve students' school records. As such, for a student at a standard high school, it is difficult to enter "SKY". Excellent students and their parents therefore avoid entering into standard high schools. Only students whose grades are too low to enter vocational school (or whose grades are simply average) enter normal high schools. This continues to discourage excellent students from attending normal high schools because the academic level of students is low. This vicious cycle turned standard schools into "slums" in the public eye. As a result, the admissions committees of top universities tend to reject students from standard schools; there is a preference to admit students from special-purpose, autonomous private schools, international schools, and schools for gifted students. This has made the competition of entering such high schools as difficult as entering top universities.

The Korean government has tried to crack down on such damaging study habits in order to allow a more balanced system, mostly by fining many privately run specialty study institutes (hakwon) for running classes as late as 12am. To solve this problem, the Korean government made a law that bans hakwons from running classes after 10:00 PM, which is often not conformed to.

The standard government-issued school curriculum is often noted as rigorous, with as many as 16 or so subjects. Most students choose to also attend hakwon to boost their academic performance. Core subjects include Korean, English and mathematics, with adequate emphasis on social and physical science subjects. Students do not typically ask questions in the classroom, but prefer to memorize details. As memorization is an out-dated and ineffective means of true mastery of a subject, compared against contemporary education standards focusing on global comprehension, application, and critical thinking, the vast majority of South Korean students transferring to a modernized education system of a highly developed country almost exclusively are found to be far behind their peers with poor ability for independent determination or complete concept understanding and synthesis . World-wide South Korean graduates are some of the least sought for Western university recruitment or career recruitment as they consistently fail to demonstrate logical and critical thinking and application skills. It is critical to note that the type and level of subjects may differ from school to school, depending on the degree of selectivity and specialization of the school . Specialty, optional, expensive, study schools help students memorize questions and answers from previous years' CSAT tests and universities' interview questions.

High school is not mandatory, unlike middle school education in Korea. However, according to a 2005 study of Organisation for Economic Co-operation and Development (OECD) member countries, some 97% of South Korea's young adults do complete high school. This was the highest percentage recorded in any country. However, this is mainly due to the fact that there is no such thing as a failing grade in Korea, and most graduate as long as they attend school a certain number of days. This system of graduation solely based on attendance further devalues a South Korean student when being evaluated for university admission in Western countries, especially as many are phasing out entrance examinations.

South Korean views on high-school selection and perceived elitism of certain schools are contrary to most Western educational systems which rigorously focus on academics, but also place a high value on diversity of the student body in a variety of aspects to maximize student exposure to differing perspectives and experiences while achieving sophisticated understanding and socialization. As it stands, the Korean secondary system of education is highly successful at preparing students for teacher-centric education, in which teachers directly communicate information to students. However, this does not hold true for classroom environments where students are expected to take on self-reliant roles wherein, for the most part, active and creative personalities seem to lead to success. Similarly, scientific studies continue to demonstrate that rote memorization, as is central in South Korean education, is not indicative of intelligence and is of deeply declining value in the Information Age.

It is becoming increasingly evident that active student use of the English language in Korean high schools is necessary to enter top universities in Korea, as well as abroad.

Vocational
South Korea had a strong vocational education system that shattered due to the Korean War and the economic collapse following the war. The vocational education system was thereafter rebuilt. For students not desiring to enter university, vocational high schools specializing in fields such as technology, agriculture, or finance are available. Around 20 percent of high school students are in vocational high schools. In vocational high schools, students split their time equally between general courses and vocational courses. General education teaches academic core courses such as Korean, mathematics, science, and social studies while vocational training offers courses related to agriculture, technology, industry, commerce, home economics, fishing, and oceanography. Agriculture, fishery, and oceanography high schools have been set up in rural areas and harbor cities to combat the shortage of labor due to urban sprawl. Agricultural high schools focus on scientific farming and are designed to produce skilled experts in agriculture while fishery and oceanography high schools utilize maritime resource to focus on navigation technology. Since the 1980s, vocational high schools have offered training in various fields to create a labor force that can adjust to the changes across South Korean industry and society. Due to needs of manpower across the heavy and chemical industries in the 1970s, the need for vocational education was crucial. By the 1980s, due to the great changes in technology, the objective of vocational education shifted to create a supply of well-trained technicians. When students graduate from vocational high school, the students receive a vocational high school diploma and may choose to enter the workforce or go on to higher education. Many vocational high school graduates go on to attend junior colleges to further their education.

As the university degree grew in prominence to employers during the 1970s and 1980s, the shift toward a more knowledge-based, rather than an industrial economy, resulted in vocational education being devalued in favor of the university when viewed by many young South Koreans and their parents. In the 1970s and 1980s, vocational education in South Korea was less than socially acceptable, yet also a pathway to succeed in obtaining a steady career with a decent income and an opportunity to elevate socioeconomic status. Even with the many positive attributes of vocational education, many vocational graduates were scorned and stigmatized by their college educated managers despite the importance of their expertise and skills in promoting South Korea's economic development.

With South Korea's high university entrance rate, the perception of vocational education still remains in doubt in the minds of many South Koreans. In 2013, only 18 percent of students were enrolled in vocational education programs. Lower enrollment continues, due largely to the perceived prestige of attending university. Additionally, only affluent families are able to afford the tutoring that many feel is required for students to pass the notoriously difficult college entrance exam. A student with low scores on the college entrance exam usually forecloses their possibility of attending university. With the pervasive bias against vocational education, vocational students are labeled as "underachievers", are viewed as lacking a formal higher educational background, and are often condescendingly looked down upon as vocational jobs are known in Korea as the "3Ds" dirty, demeaning, and dangerous. In response, the South Korean government increased the admissions to universities. Soon after, the rate of university enrollment was 68.2 percent, an increase of 15 percent over 2014. To boost the positive image of vocational education and training, the South Korean government has been collaborating with countries such as Germany, Switzerland, and Austria to examine the innovative solutions that are being implemented to improve vocational education, training, and career options for young South Koreans as alternative to the traditional university path. Many of the most developed cultures and economies view South Korea's negative bias towards vocational education and careers as backwards, often joking that South Korea will develop many great inventions, with no one to build them, and no one to service them. The same societies also perceive South Korea's obsession with individual educational attainment and the perceived prestige as an example of one of the many short-comings of the South Korean education system: logic and historical experience teach that such self and narrow minded focus leaves collective society to suffer.

According to a 2012 research report from The McKinsey Global Institute the lifetime value of a college graduate's improved earnings no longer justifies the expense required to obtain the degree. Also highlighted in the report was the need for more vocational education to counteract the human cost of performance pressure and the high unemployment rate among the country's university-educated youth. The South Korean government, schools, and industry with assistance from the Swiss government and industry are now redesigning and modernizing the country's once strong vocational education sector with a network of vocational schools called "Meister Schools". The purpose of the Meister schools is to reduce the country's shortage of vocational occupations such as auto mechanics, plumbers, welders, boilermakers, electricians, carpenters, millwrights, machinists and machine operators as many of these positions go unfilled. Meister schools have been developed to revamp South Korea's vocational education system to be specifically designed to prepare youths to work in high-skilled trades and high-skilled manufacturing jobs and other fields. The schools are based on the German-style Meister schools, to teach youngsters to become masters of a skilled trade. Meister schools were set up to tackle the nations high youth unemployment rate as millions of young South Korean university graduates remain idle instead of taking up a trade while managers of small and medium businesses complain of skilled trade shortages. Many of Meister schools offer a wide range of skilled trades and technical disciplines that offer near guarantee of employment to graduates with an industry-supported curriculum design, and focus on developing skills required by various trades. The government of South Korea has taken initiatives to improve the perception of vocational training and combat the negative stigma attached to skilled manual labour and technical work. In addition, vocational streams have been integrated with academic streams to allow a seamless transition to university in order to allow further advancement if a young South Korean chooses to pursue a university degree. Meister schools offer apprenticeship-based training which takes place at vocational high schools, community and junior colleges. Meister schools also offer employment support systems for specialized Meister high school students. The South Korean government has established an "Employment First, College Later" philosophy wherein after graduation students are encouraged to seek employment first before making plans for university. With changing demands in the Information Age workforce, global forecasts show that by 2030, the demand for vocational skills will increase in contrast to the declining demand for unskilled labor largely due to technological advances.

Negative perception and stigmatization of vocational education continues to be one of the largest challenges in South Korea. The government is encouraging younger students to visit and see various vocational programs for themselves firsthand to change their perception. Those in doubt of the quality of vocational education are encouraged to spend time working in industry during school vacations so they are up-to-date on current industry practices. Experts also encourage students and their parents to rethink their negative view of vocational trades by drawing attention to Western and other highly developed nations and the irreplaceable, foundational, and vital role vocational trades are highly recognized and honored for in these super-power economies. Meister schools are continuing to be proven a good influence in changing the opinion of vocational education, yet only 15,213 (5 percent) of high school students are enrolled in Meister schools. This is due to lack of demand for Meister school admission, despite a 100 percent employment rate after graduation. Meister students instead are using these schools as an alternative path to university. If a student works in industry for three years after graduating Meister school, they are exempt from the extremely difficult university entrance exam. Nonetheless, the perception of vocational education is changing and slowly increasing in popularity as participating students are working in highly technical, vital careers and learning real skills that are highly valued in the current marketplace, oftentimes earning more annually than their university educated peers. Vocation and Meister school graduates have been swamped with job offers in an otherwise slow economy. The initiative of Meister schools has also helped youth secure jobs at conglomerates such as Samsung over candidates who graduated from elite universities. South Korea has also streamlined its small and medium-sized business sector along German lines to ease dependence on the large conglomerates ever since it began introducing Meister schools into its education system.

In spite of the country's high unemployment rate during the Great Recession, Meister school graduates have been successful in navigating the workforce as they possess relevant and highly sought after skill sets that are in high demand and minuscule supply in the South Korean economy. Graduates of Meister high schools have been successful in the job market and are flooded with full salary career offers from top companies. Boosting employment for young people through high quality vocational education has become a top priority for the Park administration, since youth unemployment is roughly three times higher than average. Graduates from vocational high schools have been successful in navigating through South Korea's highly competitive and sluggish job market. Many graduates both quantitatively and qualitatively have found more employment opportunities in a number of industry sectors across the South Korean economy. Despite promising employment prospects and good pay offered by vocational education that rival incomes of many university graduates, negative social attitudes and prejudice towards tradespeople continues despite strong evidence of the short and long-term superiority of a career in a vocational skilled-trade. Many have voiced concerns about documented discrimination against graduates with vocational education backgrounds, a long-standing tendency of South Korean employers. The negative social stigma associated with vocational careers and not having a university degree also remains deep rooted in South Korean society. Many South Koreans still have the enduring belief that a university degree from a prestigious university is the only path to a successful career, as much of South Korean society still perceives vocational schools as institutes for students who weren't smart enough to get into university. These negative perceptions of vocational trades and graduates hamper South Korea's full participation and relevance in the global economy and society in many ways: by negatively impacting and limiting South Korea's innovation and development, by hampering the design, building, and maintenance of vital infrastructure, and by damaging the perception of South Korean society due to their illogical contrarian views of the societal and personal value of a vocational education, as well as their continued adherence to an outdated class-based societal structure. The skills acquired from vocational schools gives students many practical skills and experiences. As more vocational schools take hold, more young South Koreans are joining their world-wide peers in realizing that employing their interests and abilities in educational pursuits far outweighs the importance of the names of the schools and majors.

Higher education

Higher education in South Korea is provided primarily by universities (national research universities, industrial universities, teacher-training universities, broadcast and correspondence universities, cyber universities, graduate schools, open universities, and national universities of education) and colleges (cyber colleges, technical colleges, colleges in company, graduate school colleges) and various other research institutions. The South Korean higher education system is modeled after the United States with colleges (namely junior colleges and community colleges) awarding apprenticeships, licenses, citations, certificates, associate degrees or diplomas while universities award bachelor's, master's, professional, and doctoral degrees.

History
The history of higher education in South Korea traces its roots back the 4th century CE, starting with the founding of Daehak (National Confucian Academy) in Goguryeo in 372 CE. Modern higher education traces its roots in the late 19th century, as missionary schools would introduce subjects taught in the West and vocational schools were crucial for the development of a modern society. The development of higher education was influenced since ancient times. During King Sosurim's reign in Goguryeo, Taehak taught Confucianism, literature and martial arts. In 551, Silla founded Gukhak and taught cheirospasm. It also founded vocational education that taught astronomy and medicine. Goryeo continued Silla's program of study. Sungkyunkwan in the Joseon Dynasty period was a higher education institute of Confucianism and for government officials.

Today there are colleges and universities whose courses of study extend from 4 to 6 years. In addition, there are vocational colleges, industrial universities, open universities and universities of technology. There are day and evening classes, classes during vacation and remote education classes. The number of institutes of higher education varied consistently from 419 in 2005, to 405 in 2008, to 411 in 2010.

Private universities account for 87.3% of total higher educational institutions. Industrial universities account for 63.6% and vocational universities account for 93.8%. These are much higher than the percentage of public institutes.

University

University is the traditional route pursued by young South Koreans after graduating from high school as it is by far the most prestigious form of higher education in the country. In 2004, nearly 90 percent of general high school graduates achieved university entrance. In 2017, over 68.9% of South Korean high school graduates advanced to a university. Competition for university spots is fierce as many students vie for the most coveted spots at the country's most prestigious universities, many of which are key national research universities offering bachelor's, master's, professional and doctoral degrees. The three most recognized universities in South Korea, known as "SKY" are Seoul National University, Korea University, and Yonsei University. Other well known universities that have an international reputation in South Korea include Pusan National University, Kyungpook University, Sogang University, Sungkyunkwan University, Hanyang University, Pohang University of Science and Technology, and the research-intensive Korea Advanced Institute of Science and Technology.

Unlike the usage of grade point averages and percentages used in Western countries such as the United States and Canada as a yardstick for eligibility, entrance to South Korean universities is based largely on the scores that students achieved on the CSAT, which accounts for 60 percent of the admission criteria while the remaining 40 percent is dependent on grades from comprehensive high school records. In addition to the CSAT scores, universities also take volunteer experience, extra-curricular activities, letters of recommendation, school awards, portfolios into consideration when assessing a prospective applicant.

Bachelor's
Bachelor's degree's in South Korea are offered by universities such as four-year colleges and universities, industrial universities, national universities of education, the Korean National Open University, technical colleges and cyber universities. Bachelor's degrees typically take four years to complete while some degrees related to medicine, law, and dentistry can take up to six years. Students typically major in one or two fields of study in addition to a minor. A bachelor's degree requires up to 130 to 140 credit hours to complete. After all course requirements are met, the student receives a bachelor's degree upon graduation.

Master's
Master's degrees are offered by four-year colleges and universities, independent institutions affiliated with a four-year college or university, universities of education or the Korean National Open University. In order to be eligible and gain acceptance into a master's degree program, the applicant must possess a bachelor's degree with a GPA of 3.0 (B) or greater from a recognized higher education institution, submit two undergraduate recommendation letters from professors, and an undergraduate record showing their GPA. Qualifying examinations must also be taken in addition to an interview. Master's programs have 24 credit hours of coursework in addition to a thesis that is generally has to be completed within two years. In a master's degree program, the student must achieve a GPA of 3.0 (B) or higher, pass a comprehensive oral and written examination as well as a foreign language examination, as well as completing and defending a master's thesis in order to graduate. Upon successful completion of a master's program, the student receives a master's degree.

Doctoral
In order to gain acceptance into a doctoral program, an applicant must hold a master's degree, have a research background related to their field of study, as well as have professor recommendations. Doctorate programs are sometimes administered in conjunction with master's programs with the student needing to complete 60 credit hours in conjunction with the master's degree, with a final GPA of 3.0 (B) or higher which takes up to four years to complete. Doctoral students must also pass a comprehensive oral and written examination, two foreign language examinations, as well as completing and defending a doctoral dissertation in order to graduate. When successfully completed, the student receives a Doctoral Degree.

Vocational
Though South Korean society places a far greater emphasis on university rather than vocational education, vocational schools remain as another option for those who choose not to go take the traditional route of going to university. Negative social attitudes and prejudice towards tradespeople, technicians, and vocational school graduates are stigmatized, treated unfairly and are still looked down upon as the negative social stigma associated with vocational careers and not having a university degree continues to remain deep rooted in contemporary South Korean society. Vocational education is offered by industrial universities, junior colleges, open universities, and miscellaneous institutions.

Industrial universities
Industrial universities in South Korea are also known as polytechnics. These institutions were established in 1982 as an alternative route to higher education for people already in the workforce. Industrial universities offer both diplomas and bachelor's degrees.

Junior colleges
Junior colleges, also known as junior vocational colleges offer professional certifications in trades or technical careers and programs related to the liberal arts, early childhood education, home economics, business administration, technology, engineering, agriculture, fisheries, radiation, clinical pathology, navigation, and nursing. Most of the programs take two to three years to finish. Many of the predecessors of junior colleges were vocational high schools established in the 1960s to train mid-level technicians. Admission criteria to a junior college is the same as a four-year university though it is less competitive. 50 percent of the admission quotas are reserved for graduates of vocational high schools or applicants with national technological qualifications. When successfully completed, junior college graduates are awarded a diploma or an associate degree.

Junior college graduates may choose to enter the workforce or transfer to a four-year university to further their studies.

Miscellaneous institutions
Highly specialized programs are offered by miscellaneous institutions which grant two-year diplomas or four-year bachelor's degrees.

Foreign education

Due to the low birth rates in South Korea, there is a decline of the number of students attending secondary schools. To combat this declining trend, South Korea has looked to foreigners to fill the empty slots using a national strategy. By the year of 2023, they hoped to increase their numbers of foreign students' times three, but their number of foreign students declined from 89,537 students to about 5,000 fewer than before. This is due to the competition within the job market and foreigners finding it hard to compete with Koreans who are so highly educated. Even with this decline in foreign students attending Korean schools, it is the more attractive option than other countries whose prices are much higher. Some universities in South Korea offer discounts up to 50% off for foreigners to attend, and they are continuing to add more benefits to reach their goal of over 200,000 students (Krechetnikov, 2016).

With over 20 cyber-universities in South Korea, it makes it simple for foreigners to access knowledge and education from another country that is not their own. It also makes it easy for working citizens and foreigners to do their jobs and earn at education at the same time (Krechetnikov, 2016).

The main reasons that foreigners often seek an education in Korea is to obtain either a masters or a bachelor's degree at a cheaper price with potentially higher quality. However, South Korea is expanding what foreigners can achieve. Students from all around the world are now able to pursue doctorate degrees in multiple fields within the Korean education system. Although the number of fields for which foreign students can pursue a doctorate in is still limited to a few, South Korea is ramping up in its expansion. Some of the most popular fields of study in South Korea for foreign students is technology, computer programing, and Web design to name a few (Krechetnikov, 2016).

Scholarships and academic grants allow foreign students to pay their college tuition on their own without any extra financial help. Currently, South Korea has students attending their universities from just about anywhere in the world (Krechetnikov, 2016).

Government influence

Ministry of Education
The Ministry of Education has been responsible for South Korean education since 25 February 2013. Its name was The Ministry of Education, Science and Technology (often abbreviated into "the Ministry of Education") since 25 February 2008 to 24 February 2013. The former body, the Ministry of Education and Human Resources Development, was named by the former Minister of Education, who enhanced its function in 2001 because the administration of Kim Dae-jung considered education and human resources development as a matter of the highest priority. As a result of the reform, it began to cover the whole field of human resource development and the minister of education was appointed to the Vice Prime Minister. In 2008, the name was changed into the present one after the Lee Myeong Bak administration annexed the former Ministry of Science and Technology to the Education ministry. 
Like other ministers, the Minister of Education, Science and Technology is appointed by the president. They are mainly chosen from candidates who have an academic background and often resign in a fairly short term (around one year).
(Ministry of Education has no more work on science and technology because President Park restorated the Ministry works for science and technology)

Teachers' union
Although primary- and secondary-school teachers traditionally enjoyed high status, they often were overworked and underpaid during the late 1980s. Salaries were less than those for many other white-collar professions and even some blue-collar jobs. High school teachers, particularly those in the cities, however, received sizable gifts from parents seeking attention for their children, but teaching hours were long and classes crowded (the average class contained around fifty to sixty students).

In May 1989, teachers established an independent union, the Korean Teachers Union (KTU — 전국교직원노동조합(전교조), Jeongyojo). Their aims included improving working conditions and reforming a school system that they regarded as overly controlled by the Ministry of Education. Although the government promised large increases in allocations for teachers' salaries and facilities, it refused to give the union legal status. Because teachers were civil servants, the government claimed they did not have the right to strike and, even if they did have the right to strike, unionization would undermine the status of teachers as "role models" for young Koreans. The government also accused the union of spreading subversive, leftist propaganda that was sympathetic to the communist regime in North Korea.

According to a report in The Wall Street Journal Asia, the union claimed support from 82 percent of all teachers. The controversy was viewed as representing a major crisis for South Korean education because a large number of teachers (1,500 by November 1989) had been dismissed, violence among union supporters, opponents, and police had occurred at several locations, and class disruptions had caused anxieties for families of students preparing for the college entrance examinations. The union's challenge to the Ministry of Education's control of the system and the charges of subversion had made compromise seem a very remote possibility at the start 1990.

Political involvement in the education system
South Korea still has issues with North Korea after the Korean War. This has contributed to South Korea's confrontational stance against North Korea in the education field. For instance, on 7 July 2011, the National Intelligence Service was criticized for the search and seizure of a civilian think tank, Korea Higher Education Research Institution. This incident was carried out through a warrant to investigate an alleged South Korean spy who followed an instruction from North Korea with a purpose of instigating university student rallies to stop the ongoing tuition hike in South Korea.

English education
Korea has an extensive English education history dating back to the Joseon Dynasty. During this time, Koreans received English education in public institutes, where translators were instructed for conversion of Korean into foreign languages. The Public Foreign Language School established in 1893, educated young males to perform tasks to modernize Korea. This school, unlike facilities such as Yuk Young Gong Won (1886), disregarded social statuses, welcoming more students into the institute and introducing the first Korean foreign language instructors into the field of English education.

English was also taught during the Joseon Dynasty in missionary schools, which were established to spread the word of the Christian faith to Koreans, although these schools did not equip its students with the necessary tools to read, write, comprehend and speak the language. Direct Method teaching was uncommon, as instructors were often unqualified as English teachers and the textbook was limited to the Holy Bible. During the Japanese Imperialism Period, Koreans were forced to prioritize the learning and speaking of Japanese. English was offered only as an elective course, though, the instructors were often Japanese, hindering proper English pronunciation. After the liberation of Korea from Japan in 1945, the first national curriculum was established in 1955, launching greater pursuit of English education and returning the nation to speaking its native tongue.

The relevance of early English education and globalization were brought to the attention of South Korea during the 1986 Asian Games and Seoul Olympic Games, as many came to realize the value of the English language. English is taught as a required subject from the third year of elementary school up to high school, as well as in most universities, with the goal of performing well on the TOEIC and TOEFL, which are tests of reading, listening and grammar-based English. For students who achieve high scores, there is also a speaking evaluation. Universities began lecturing in English to help improve competence and though only few were competent enough themselves to lead a class, many elementary school teachers were also recommended to teach in English.

In 1994, the university entrance examination moved away from testing grammar, towards a more communicative method. Parents redirected the focus of English education to align with exam content. English Language Education programs focus on ensuring competency to perform effectively as a nation in an era of globalization using proficiency-based language programs that allow students to learn according to their own abilities and interests and driving Koreans to focus more on oral proficiency. With the new focus placed on oral expertise, there has been an "intense desire to speak native-like English" pressuring parents to take measures to ensure the most beneficial English education.

Because of large class sizes and other factors in public schools, many parents pay to send their children to private English-language schools in the afternoon or evening. Families invest significant portions of household incomes on the education of children to include English camps and language training abroad. Usually different private English-language schools specialize in teaching elementary school students or in middle and high school students. The most ambitious parents send their children to kindergartens that utilize English exclusively in the classroom. Many children also live abroad for anywhere from a few months to several years to learn English. Sometimes, a Korean mother and her children will move to an English-speaking country for an extended period of time to enhance the children's English ability. In these cases, the father left in Korea is known as a gireogi appa (Korean: 기러기 아빠), literally a "goose dad" who must migrate to see his family.

There are more than 100,000 Korean students in the U.S. The increase of 10 percent every year helped Korea remain the top student-sending country in the U.S. for a second year, ahead of India and China. Korean students at Harvard University are the third most after Canadian and Chinese. In 2012, 154,000 South Korean students were pursuing degrees at overseas universities, with countries such as Japan, Canada, the United States, and Australia as top destinations.

Korean English classes focus on vocabulary, grammar, and reading. Academies tend to include conversation, and some offer debate and presentation.

Due to recent curriculum changes, the education system in Korea is now placing a greater emphasis on English verbal abilities rather than grammatical skills. With influence from the government, English education began to focus on the communicative competence of Korean students emphasizing fluency and comprehension through listening materials. Universities require all first year students to take an English conversation class in their first year and some universities require students to take conversational English classes throughout the entirety of their university life. According to a 2003 survey conducted by the Hong Kong-based Political and Economic Risk Consultancy, despite being one of the countries in Asia that spent the most money on English-language education, South Korea ranked the lowest among 12 Asian countries in English ability. However, in 2020, South Korea has significantly improved its English knowledge and proficiency, ranking 6th out of 25 countries in Asia, by Education First.

English as a subject discipline, that is, the study of linguistics, literature, composition/rhetoric, or pedagogy is uncommon except in top-tier or graduate programs in Korea. As a result, despite efforts to recruit foreign faculty in Korean universities, opportunities for tenure are fewer and professorial privileges and salaries are lower than for foreigners contracted to teach major disciplinary courses in English (content-based instruction). Overall, more native English speakers are being employed as educators in Korea to improve the English education process. Koreans have come to believe native English speakers are the best teachers of the language and to be proficient in the English language gives their children an advantage over others and is an "educational investment that promises surplus"(Han, 2007).

Controversy and criticism

Students' health
South Korea's scarcity of natural resources is often cited as a reason for the rigorousness and fierce competition of its school systems; the academic pressure on its students is arguably the largest in the world. In an article entitled "An Assault Upon Our Children", Se-Woong Koo wrote that "the system's dark side casts a long shadow. Dominated by tiger moms, cram schools and highly authoritarian teachers, South Korean education produces ranks of overachieving students who pay a stiff price in health and happiness. The entire program amounts to child abuse. It should be reformed and restructured without delay." In a response to the article, educator Diane Ravitch warned against modeling an educational system in which children "exist either to glorify the family or to build the national economy." She argued furthermore that the happiness of South Korean children has been sacrificed, and likened the country's students to "cogs in a national economic machine". A 2014 Lee Ju-ho, the minister representing the Ministry of Education & Science Technology, announced a plan on 8 February 2011, to dispatch un-hired reserve teachers overseas for extra training despite the opposition from the Korean Teachers Union and other public workers in the city-level and the provincial level.
South Korean schools have a strong tendency to neglect physical education due to the over-emphasis of classroom-based education.
81% of middle and high schools forbid relationships among students.
A citizen group under the Unification Church gives out sexual virginity awards under an uncertain standard.
The low emphasis on vocational education and stigmatization in Korea with regards to skilled trade or vocational careers (often dismissed as DDD jobs, 'dirty, dangerous, and demeaning' with low social standing). It has been additionally been criticized for producing an oversupply of university graduates in the country which means that university graduates often have difficulty in finding jobs while many vocational occupational positions sometimes go unfilled. According to Jasper Kim, a visiting scholar of East Asian studies at Harvard University, "There are a lot of highly educated, arguably over-educated people, but on the flip side, the demand side, they all want to work for a narrow bandwidth of companies, namely the LGs and Samsungs of the world". Kim also states that many highly educated South Koreans who don't get selected often become second-class citizens, with fewer opportunities for employment and even marriage.
There are concerns of overload of schoolworks and exam preparations that could threaten the students' health and emotions.
The South Korean education system does not allow any leeways for students' rights. The Superintendent of Seoul Metropolitan Office of Education Kwak No Hyun made a remark how "it is very embarrassing to discuss verbosely about the poor development of students' rights within the South Korean society" during his seminar on 3 March 2011.
There are concerns about the severe lack of community spirit among South Korean students that comes from examinations as the main educational direction and from an analysis according to Dr. Lee Mi-na from SNU Sociology: "harsh competition-oriented and success-oriented parenting among the parents".
The Korean Federation of Teachers' Associations announced that 40% of teachers are not satisfied with the loss of teachers' powers in classroom due to the new Teachers' Evaluation System.
The Ministry of Education and Science, the Ministry of National Defense, and the Korean Federation of Teachers' Association signed an MOU on 25 May 2011 to a verbose national security education to younger kids, in which it potentially violates the UN Children's Rights protocol.
OECD ranked South Korean elementary, middle, and high school students the lowest in terms of happiness compared to other OECD countries. This survey also echoes similar results to students in Seoul according to SMOE.
Dr. Seo Yu-hyeon, a brain expert from Seoul National University Faculty of Medicines criticized South Korea's private educations among toddlers due to the forceful nature of these educational pursuits that could deteriorate creativity and block any healthy brain development.
The Korean Educational Development Institute reports that the majority of university students lacks the ability to ask questions to instructors mainly due to the education system that promotes examinations and instructors having too many students to handle.
A survey from the Korean Federation of Teachers' Associations found out that 79.5% of the school teachers are not satisfied with their careers, a growing trend for three straight years.
The accounts of sexual abuses in school are increasing.
The government banned coffee in all schools in a bid to improve children's health. The ban came into force on 14 September 2018.

Academic elitism
The South Korean political system has a strong academic elitism. In June 2005, Conservative politician Jeon Yeo-ok openly opposed the nomination of the former president Roh Moo-hyun who did not graduate from a higher level institution, but passed the state-run judicial examinations.

Freedom of speech 
There is an ongoing debate about academic freedom on South Korean college campuses. In 2021, sociology professor at Seoul's Yonsei University, Lew Seok-choon, was indicted and charged with three counts of defamation for his remarks in his lectures stating that the comfort women weren't taken forcefully by the Japanese military and the work was "a form of prostitution".

See also

 Education in North Korea
 Gifted education#Republic of Korea
 Seoul Metropolitan Office of Education
 Student and university culture in South Korea
 South Korea's college entrance system
 List of universities and colleges in South Korea

Notes and references

Notes

References

Further reading
 Adams, D., & Gottlieb, E. E. Education and social change in Korea (Garland, 1993). 
 Ahn, Hyejeong. Attitudes to World Englishes: Implications for Teaching English in South Korea (Taylor & Francis, 2017).
 Arita, Shin. Education and Social Stratification in South Korea (2019)
 
 Chung, B. M. Development and education: A critical appraisal of the Korean case (Seoul: SNUPRESS, 2010).
 Card, James. "Appetite for language costs S Korea dear". The Guardian Weekly, 15 December 2006. 
 Choi, Hoon, and Álvaro Choi. "Regulating private tutoring consumption in Korea: Lessons from another failure". International Journal of Educational Development 49 (2016): 144-156 online.
 Hollstein, Matthew Scott. "Social Studies in South Korea: Examining Teacher and Teacher Educator's Views". Journal of International Social Studies 8.2 (2018): 78-102 online.
 Jambor, Paul Z. "The 'Foreign English Teacher' A Necessary 'Danger' in South Korea", U.S. Department of Education - Education Resources Information Center, 2010
 Jambor, Paul Z, 'Sexism, Ageism and Racism Prevalent Throughout the South Korean System of Education' U.S. Department of Education: Educational Resources Information Center, 2009 
 Jambor, Paul Z, 'Protectionism in South Korean Universities' Academic Leadership (2010), Volume 8, Issue 2
 Jambor, Paul Z, 'Slide and prejudice', Times Higher Education, 10 December 2009.
 Jambor Paul Z.  "English Language Necessity: What It means for Korea and Non-English Speaking Countries", U.S. Department of Education - Education Resources Information Center, 2012.
 Jo, Hyejeong. "Changes and Challenges in the Rise of Mass Higher Education in Korea". in Massification of Higher Education in Asia (Springer, Singapore, 2018) pp. 39–56 online.
 Johnsrud, Linda K. "Korean academic women: Multiple roles, multiple challenges". Higher Education 30, no. 1 (1995): 17–35.
 Kim, Terri. "Internationalisation of higher education in South Korea: Reality, rhetoric, and disparity in academic culture and identities". Australian Journal of Education 49, no. 1 (2005): 89–103.
 Kim, Terri. "Higher Education Reforms in South Korea: Public—Private Problems in Internationalising and Incorporating Universities". Policy Futures in Education 6.5 (2008): 558-568 online.
 Lee, Chong Jae, Yong Kim, and Soo-yong Byun. "The rise of Korean education from the ashes of the Korean War". Prospects 42.3 (2012): 303-318 online.
 Lee, Jeong-Kyu. Korean Higher Education: A Confucian Perspective (2002). 
 Lee, Jeong-Kyu. Historic Factors Influencing Korean Higher Education (2000). 
 Lee, Jeong-Kyu. Higher Education in Korea: The Perspectives of Globalization and Happiness (2012). 
 Lee, Sungho H. "The academic profession in Korea". in The International Academic Profession: Portraits from Fourteen Countries (1996): 97–148.
 Lo, Adrienne, Nancy Abelmann, et al. South Korea's Education Exodus: The Life and Times of Early Study Abroad (2017) excerpt
 Oh, Eunsil. "Defining Female Achievement: Gender, Class, and Work in Contemporary Korea' (PhD. Diss. Harvard U. 2018) online with long bibliography.
 Park, Hyunjoon. "South Korea: Educational expansion and inequality of opportunity in higher education". (2007).
 Park, HyunJu, et al. "Teachers' perceptions and practices of STEAM education in South Korea". Eurasia Journal of Mathematics, Science and Technology Education 12.7 (2016): 1739-1753 online.
 Seth, Michael J. Education Fever: Society, Politics, and the Pursuit of Schooling in South Korea (U of Hawaii Press, 2002).
 Sorensen, Clark W. "Success and education in South Korea". Comparative Education Review 38.1 (1994): 10–35. online
 Synott, John P. Teacher Unions, Social Movements and the Politics of Education in Asia: South Korea, Taiwan and the Philippines (Routledge 2003)
 Yang, Eunjoo, Sang Min Lee, and Sung-Sik Ahn. "Career centers in higher education in South Korea: Past, present, and future". Asian Journal of Counselling 19, no. 1 (2012): 2-53.
 Yang, Hyunwoo. "The role of social capital at home and in school in academic achievement: The case of South Korea". Asia Pacific Education Review 18.3 (2017): 373-384 online.

External links
 Ministry of Education, Science, and Technology
 Kuhn, Anthony (2 July 2009). "Korean School Preps Students For Ivy League". All Things Considered, 
 Ripley, Amanda (25 September 2011). "Teacher, Leave Those Kids Alone". Time. On the problem of the hagwon cram schools.
 Information on education in Korea, OECD - Contains indicators and information about Korea and how it compares to other OECD and non-OECD countries
 Diagram of Korean education system, OECD - Using 1997 ISCED classification of programmes and typical ages. 
 Also in country language